Durazno Fútbol Club is a former football club from Durazno in Uruguay.

History
Asociación Atlética Durazno Fútbol Club was founded through the association of many clubs of the department of Durazno. Those associated clubs were: Central, Juvenil, Nacional, Molles, and Rampla.

The club were founded in 2005, making them one of the youngest teams in Uruguay. They made their debut in the 2nd division on September 16, 2006, with a surprising and important victory over El Tanque Sisley for 3–0.

On the 2008–09 season of the Uruguayan Segunda División, they got to the playoffs finals and failed to promote to the Top Division after losing 4–1 in the global by Atenas de San Carlos.

After the 2010–2011 season Durazno FC disappear from all competitions.

External links
A.A. Durazno Fútbol Club site

Defunct football clubs in Uruguay
Association football clubs established in 2005
2005 establishments in Uruguay
Association football clubs disestablished in 2011
2011 disestablishments in Uruguay
Sport in Durazno Department